Walter Lancashire (28 October 1903 – 7 June 1981) was an English amateur first-class cricketer of the 1930s and a schoolteacher.

Born in Yorkshire, Lancashire was educated at Rotherham Grammar School and Sheffield University . A right-handed batsman and right-arm medium pace bowler, he was a schoolteacher in Southampton who played cricket in his free time. He made his first-class debut in the 1935 County Championship for Hampshire against Somerset. He played six first-class matches in 1935, taking his maiden first-class wicket against Nottinghamshire.

In the 1936 County Championship Lancashire played eight matches. In the match in May against Essex his 32 and 66 (his highest first-class score, made in 50 minutes) contributed to a 147-run victory. He played his last four matches for Hampshire in 1937.

After the Second World War he taught at The Thomas Hardye School in Dorchester. He played regularly for the minor county Dorset from 1946 to 1950. He died at Dorchester on 7 June 1981.

References

External links
Walter Lancashire at Cricinfo
Walter Lancashire at CricketArchive

1903 births
1981 deaths
People from Hemsworth
English cricketers
Hampshire cricketers
Dorset cricketers
Schoolteachers from Hampshire